Saul Landau (January 15, 1936 – September 9, 2013) was an American journalist, filmmaker and commentator. He was also a professor emeritus at California State Polytechnic University, Pomona, where he taught history and digital media.

Education 
Landau was born in the Bronx, New York City. A graduate of Manhattan's Stuyvesant High School, he also earned bachelor's and master's degrees in history from the University of Wisconsin, Madison.

He donated his early papers and films to the Wisconsin Center for Film and Television Research.

Career 
Landau authored 14 books, produced and directed over 50 documentary films, and wrote editorial columns including for the Huffington Post  

He frequently appeared on radio and TV shows.

Gore Vidal said, "Saul Landau is a man I love to steal ideas from."

Landau was a fellow of the Institute for Policy Studies (IPS) in Washington, D.C. and a senior fellow and former director of the Transnational Institute in Amsterdam.

He received an Emmy for his film  Paul Jacobs and the Nuclear Gang (1980), which he co-directed with Jack Willis, with cinematography by Academy Award-winning filmmaker Haskell Wexler. He won the Edgar Allan Poe Award 1981 for "Best Fact Crime" for Assassination on Embassy Row (with John Dinges; Pantheon 1980) about the murder of TNI Director Orlando Letelier and their colleague and friend Ronnie Karpen-Moffitt. He received the Letelier-Moffitt Human Rights Award for his life's contribution to human rights and also received the Bernado O'Higgins award.

In the early 1960s, he was a member of the San Francisco Mime Troupe and wrote the play "The Minstrel Show." At that time he was also working as a film distributor.

Landau donated his Latin American-related films and papers to the University of California, Riverside Libraries in 2005.

Death 
Landau died after battling bladder cancer for two years on September 9, 2013, at his home in Alameda, California. He was 77.

Films 
Landau's films are distributed by Round World Productions. His 1968 film "Fidel" is distributed by Microcinema.

 Losing just the same (1966)
 Fidel (1968)
 From Protest to Resistance (1968)
 Que Hacer/What is to be Done? (1971) – Saul Landau, Raúl Ruiz, James Becket, Jaime Sierra, Nina Serrano.
 Conversation with Allende (1971)
 Brazil: A Report on Torture (1971)
 Robert Wall: Ex-FBI Agent (1972)
 The Jail (1972)
 Zombies in a House of Madness (1972) – Shot in the San Francisco jail.
 Song for Dead Warriors (1974) – A documentary about the Wounded Knee occupation in the spring of 1973 by Oglala Sioux Indians and members of the American Indian Movement (AIM)
 Who Shot Alexander Hamilton (1974)
 Castro, Cuba and the US (1974)
 Zombies in a House of Madness (1975) – A short film where jail house poet, Michael Beasley, reads his poetry alongside footage taken inside the San Francisco jail, in 1972.
 Land of My Birth (1976) – The campaign film for Michael Manley in Jamaica.
 Bill Moyer's CBS report on CIA and Cuba (1977)
 The CIA Case Officer (1978) – A documentary about John Stockwell, a former CIA official who served in the CIA for 12 years, mostly in Africa and Vietnam. The film won an Emmy Award (1980), George F. Polk Award for investigative journalism on TV, Hefner First Amendment Award for journalism, and the Mannheim Film Festival first critics' prize.
 Paul Jacobs and the Nuclear Gang (1979) – A political documentary about government suppression of the health hazards of low-level radiation. Paul Jacobs died from lung cancer before the documentary was finished. His doctors believed he contracted it while he was investigating nuclear policies in 1957. Jacobs interviewed civilians and soldiers, survivors of nuclear experiments in the 50s and 60s, testing the effects of radiation.
 Steppin''' (1980) – A documentary about Michael Manley on his tour in Jamaica, during election time.
 Report from Beirut (1982)
 Target Nicaragua. Inside a Covert War (1983)
 Quest for Power (1983)
 The Uncompromising Revolution (1988)
 Report from Iraq (1991)
 Papakolea (1993)
 The Sixth Sun: Mayan Uprising in Chiapas (1996)
 Maquila: A Tale of Two Mexicos (1999) – A documentary about the corporate globalization on the US-Mexican border.
 Iraq: Voices From the Street (September 2002)
 Syria: Between Iraq and a Hard Place (2004)
 Will the Real Terrorist Please Stand Up (2012)
 "WE DON'T PLAY GOLF HERE – and other stories of globalization" Books 

 The Bisbee deportations: class conflict and patriotism during World War I, University of Wisconsin—Madison, 1959
 
 Landau, Saul, Jacobs, Paul, & Pell, Eve, To Serve the Devil, Volume 1: Natives and Slaves Vintage Books, 1971.  
 Landau, Saul, Jacobs, Paul, & Pell, Eve To Serve the Devil – Volume 2: Colonials and Sojourners Vintage Books, 1971. 
 
 They Educated the Crows, Transnational Institute, 1978 – a Transnational Institute Report on the Letelier-Moffitt Murders
 
 
 My Dad Was Not Hamlet: Poems, Institute for Policy Studies, 1993 
 The guerrilla wars of Central America: Nicaragua, El Salvador, and Guatemala, St Martin's Press, 1993, 
 Hot air: a radio diary, Pacifica Network News/Institute for Policy Studies, 1995 – Saul Landau, Christopher Hitchens, Pacifica Radio 
 Red Hot Radio: Sex, Violence and Politics at the End of the American Century, Common Courage Press, 1998 
 
 
  - with Gore Vidal. In this book, he defines his position on the 2006 Cuban transfer of presidential duties, Cuba in the 1960s, Raúl Castro and his opinion on the U.S. concerning Cuba
 Saul Landau (2013). Stark in the Bronx: A Detective Novel. CounterPunch Books. 

 Awards 
 Bernardo O'Higgins Award for Human Rights
 Letelier-Moffit Human Rights Award
 George Polk Award for Investigative Reporting
 Joe A. Callaway Award for Civic Courage (2013)
 Emmy Award
 Roxie Award for Best Activist Video
 Hugh M. Hefner First Amendment Award
 Mannheim Film Festival: Critics' First Prize
 Ann Arbor Film Festival First Prize
 Berlin Film Festival First Prize
 Best Director Award First American Indian Intercontinental Film Festival
 Golden Apple Award
 Best Picture North Carolina Smoky Mountain Film Festival
 Edgar Allan Poe Award, for "Assassination on Embassy Row"

 References 

 External links 
 Saul Landau's website
 Saul Landau's blog
 Round World Productions, distributor for Saul Landau's films
 Microcinema International DVD distributes the classic 1968 film "Fidel"
 Saul Landau's profile at the Transnational Institute. Includes recent articles and essays.
 Saul Landau's page at Cal Poly Pomona
 "Emmy-winning Documentary Filmmaker to Speak at UC Riverside: Saul Landau Has Focused on Social Issues, Human Rights for 40 years"
  "Will the Real Terrorist Please Stand Up"
Guide to the Saul Landau Papers at the University of California, Riverside Librariea
 Will the Real Terrorist Please Stand Up: Saul Landau on U.S.-Aided Anti-Castro Militants & the Cuban 5, Democracy Now!'', June 2012

American documentary filmmakers
American male journalists
American political writers
Writers on Latin America
Latin Americanists
Journalists from California
Journalists from the San Francisco Bay Area
Journalists from New York City
Jewish American journalists
American male poets
20th-century American poets
20th-century American non-fiction writers
20th-century American male writers
California State Polytechnic University, Pomona faculty
Emmy Award winners
University of Wisconsin–Madison College of Letters and Science alumni
Stuyvesant High School alumni
People from Alameda, California
People from the Bronx
American people of Ukrainian-Jewish descent
Deaths from cancer in California
Deaths from bladder cancer
1936 births
2013 deaths